Good Lord Without Confession (French: Le Bon Dieu sans confession) is a 1953 French drama film directed by Claude Autant-Lara and starring Danielle Darrieux, Henri Vilbert and Claude Laydu.  It was shot at the Francoeur Studios in Paris. The film's sets were designed by the art director Max Douy. The film premiered at the Venice Film Festival in September 1953 and went on general release in France the following month. Henri Vilbert won the Volpi Cup for Best Actor for his performance.

Synopsis
At the funeral of François Dupont, his various associates walk in the procession including his wife, children, business partner and mistress Janine. The various characters recall their experiences with the deceased. In flashback we see Janine's relationship with Dupont, and how she had manipulated and exploited him through the turbulent years of the Occupation and Liberation. Ultimately her machinations fail and she loses the man she really loves, her husband Maurice.

Cast
 Danielle Darrieux as 	Janine Fréjoul
 Henri Vilbert as 	François Dupont
 Claude Laydu as 	Roland Dupont
 Ivan Desny as 	Maurice Fréjoul
 Grégoire Aslan as 	Varesco
 Myno Burney as 	Marie Dupont
 Isabelle Pia as Denise Dupont
 Jean Dunot as 	Marfoisse
 Julien Carette as	Eugène
 Claude Berri as 	Le fils d'Eugène 
 Georges Bever as 	Albert, le domestique 
 Jo Dest as 	Weber 
 Michel Dumur as 	Roland enfant 
 Marie-Chantal Fefert as Denise enfant 
 Marcelle Féry as 	La concierge 
 René Lacourt as 	Le bistrotier
 Michel Le Royer as Thierry, le petit ami de Denise 
 Madeleine Suffel as 	La marchande des quatre saisons

References

Bibliography
 Biggs, Melissa E. French films, 1945-1993: a critical filmography of the 400 most important releases. McFarland & Company, 1996.
Walker-Morrison, Deborah. Classic French Noir: Gender and the Cinema of Fatal Desire. Bloomsbury Publishing, 2020.

External links 
 

1953 films
1953 drama films
French drama films
1950s French-language films
Films directed by Claude Autant-Lara
Pathé films
Films based on French novels
Films shot at Francoeur Studios
Films with screenplays by Roland Laudenbach
1950s French films